Nostima niveivenosa is a species of shore flies in the family Ephydridae.

Distribution
United States, Neotropics.

References

Ephydridae
Insects described in 1930
Taxa named by Ezra Townsend Cresson
Diptera of North America